William George Giles OBE (born 18 November 1939) is a retired British weather forecaster and television presenter.

Early life
Bill Giles was born in Dittisham, near Dartmouth, Devon, England, and first became interested in meteorology whilst at Queen Elizabeth's Grammar School in Crediton . He joined the Met Office in January 1957 on leaving Bristol College of Science and Technology (became the University of Bath in 1965).

Career
From 1961 to 1963, he was based in Germany as an observer with the RAF and from 1968 to 1970, worked as a lecturer at the Met Office's training college.

His broadcasting career began in 1972 when he transferred to the London Weather Centre. In 1980, promotion took him back to Bracknell where he worked in public relations. On the retirement of Jack Scott (in 1983), he returned to lead BBC Television's Met Office forecasting team.
 
In 1999, he was accused of bullying weathermen/women at the Weather Centre. Although at first found guilty by the Met Office, on appeal, he was cleared of all wrongdoing.

He retired from the Met Office in January 2000 after having led the team of Broadcast Meteorologists since 1983.

He is also a member of the International Association of Broadcast Meteorology (IABM).

Personal life
He married Eileen Lake in 1961 in Devon, but divorced in 1991. They have a son (born 1969) and daughter (born 1971). In May 1993, he married Patricia Stafford in Bullingdon, Oxfordshire. He currently resides in Oxfordshire. Previous to the early 1990s, he lived in Chalfont St Giles in the former Chiltern District of Buckinghamshire.

He was awarded the OBE in 1995.

He is a keen exponent of lawn bowls. In May 2011, he was involved in a BBC Breakfast news clip which focused on recruiting younger people to the sport.

References

External links
 BBC biography.
 Bill Giles' website.
 Bill Giles comments on his appeal against the Met Office's findings.
BBC Weather forecast by Bill Giles from 4 April 1996. https://www.youtube.com/watch?v=U1yDD2TeAtc

1939 births
Alumni of the University of Bath
BBC weather forecasters
English meteorologists
Living people
People from Chalfont St Giles
People from Crediton
People educated at Queen Elizabeth's Grammar School, Crediton
Officers of the Order of the British Empire